Hawaii is located in the Hawaii–Aleutian Time Zone (HST; UTC−10:00) and does not observe daylight saving time. Hawaii adopted HST in 1947, switching from UTC−10:30, which it had used since 1896.

Effects of standard time on television broadcasting

Most cable providers in Hawaii carry the west coast feed of television networks. Hawaii is located two hours behind the Pacific Time Zone, so programs will air in Hawaii two hours later than their advertised start time. Between March and November, when daylight saving time is in effect in most of the contiguous United States, this is increased to three hours as Hawaii does not observe daylight saving time.

IANA time zone database
The zone for Hawaii as given by zone.tab of the IANA time zone database. Columns marked * are from the zone.tab.

See also
 Time in the United States

References

Hawaii
Geography of Hawaii